The GP de la Ville d'Oran is a one-day race held annually since 2015 in Algeria, rated 1.2 and is part of UCI Africa Tour.

Winners

References

Cycle races in Algeria
2015 establishments in Algeria
Recurring sporting events established in 2015
UCI Africa Tour races